The Roman Catholic Diocese of Cancún–Chetumal is a suffragan of the Metropolitan Archdiocese of Yucatán. It was elevated from a Roman Catholic Territorial Prelature on February 15, 2020.

History 
It was erected on 23 May 1970 as the Territorial Prelature of Chetumal, renamed 20 December 1996, as reflected in its double see-name.  On 15 February 2020, while keeping the see name, it was raised to diocese.

It has a cathedral see, Catedral de la Santísima Trinidad, in Cancun, and a co-cathedral, Catedral del Sagrado Corazón, in Chetumal, both in Quintana Roo on the Yucatán Peninsula.

Episcopal incumbents 
All its prelates were members of the Legion of Christ (L.C.)

 Jorge Bernal Vargas, L.C. (1973–2004) - Prelate Emeritus (initially Apostolic Administrator; title Chetumal till 1996)
 Pedro Pablo Elizondo Cárdenas, L.C. (2004 -); changed from Territorial Prelate to Bishop of the diocese, 15 Feb. 2020

External links and references 

 GigaCatholic

References

Roman Catholic dioceses in Mexico
Territorial prelatures
Roman Catholic Ecclesiastical Province of Yucatán
Christian organizations established in 1970
Roman Catholic dioceses and prelatures established in the 20th century
Cancún
1970 establishments in Mexico
Chetumal